Cecilia "Cissi" Elwin Frenkel, née Elwin (born 1 June 1965) is a Swedish journalist and television presenter. She was early on a journalist for SVT and Expressen and along with Martin Timell the first presenters of the youth show Bullen which was broadcast on SVT. Between 2000 and 2006 she was the editor in chief for Ica-kuriren and in 2006 she became the publication chief for the media corporation Forma Publishing Group.

On 25 March 2006, she became the CEO of Svenska filminstitutet, a post she held until 2010.  Frenkel is in a relationship with the director Tomas Alfredson and the couple have two children together.

In 2003, she was a Sommarpratare for the Sveriges Radio show Sommar i P1.

References

External links

Swedish journalists
Swedish women journalists
Swedish television personalities
Swedish women television presenters
Living people
1965 births